"Reach Out" is a song recorded by American singer Hilary Duff for the planned re-release of her fourth studio album, Dignity (2007). The song features uncredited vocals from American rapper R. Prophet. It was written by Martin Gore, Ryan "Alias" Tedder, Evan Bogart, Mika Guillory and produced by Tedder. The song was released on October 20, 2008, by Hollywood Records as the only single from Duff's first greatest hits album, Best of Hilary Duff (2008).

Background and production 
Duff said in September 2007 that a previously unheard song on the Dignity Tour's set list, "Reach Out", would be released as a single. In an interview with Joe Bermudez in November 2007, Duff revealed that her fourth studio album Dignity would be re-released. The re-release would feature remixes of the original songs alongside "two or three" new recordings, including "Reach Out" and "Holiday". While "Reach Out" and "Holiday" were already completed, Duff hoped to write a third new song for the re-release, but this never came to be. Duff revealed that she wanted "Holiday" to be either the first or second single from the re-release.

The song was produced by Ryan "Alias" Tedder and co-written by Tedder, Evan Bogart, and Mika Guillory. It is built around a sample of Depeche Mode's 1989 song "Personal Jesus", written by Martin Gore. On the final episode of MTV's Total Request Live, Duff described the song by saying that "[i]t's different for me. It's a little dancey, and there's a rapper named R. Prophet who's on it who's really cool and kinda fresh".

Critical response 
The song received mixed reviews from critics upon its release. Popjustice gave the song a negative review, stating that "[w]ith so much medocrity in the song's three-and-a-half minute duration it's hard to pinpoint the most useless and perfunctory thing about Hilary Duff's toweringly boring new, track 'Reach Out'. E! Online called "Reach Out" a "muffed attempt". Digital Spy said that "The fact that Duff replaces the original lyric "reach out and touch faith" with "reach out and touch me" pretty much says it all. Originally written about Elvis's love for his wife Priscilla, the Lizzie McGuire star sacrilegiously turns this into an innuendo-laden squelch-fest. Accompanied by a video that sees Duff humping a marble statue, a tree trunk and the camera, 'Reach Out' has an unpleasant whiff of desperation about it". However, AllMusic gave the song a positive review, picking the song as one of the top 3 AMG Picks in the album.

NewMusicReviews gave the two versions of "Reach Out" a seven out of ten rating, calling Hilary's version a "great updated version of a classic track [Depeche Mode's "Personal Jesus"]. The dance remixes are fantastic and this should bang the clubs, and could do decent on the radio." They also praised The Prophet's rapping parts stating he "has got some decent lyrics, but he's not featured on much of the track."
Andy H of Angryape (UK) said the song "should do well, no doubt there – considering the current trend of electro-pop, with the club beat, rocky guitar sample and a confident sexiness in the vocals."
RightCelebrity said "while some are liking the new mature, sexy Hilary Duff, some say she tried too hard, and original songs are always better. You always get the haters when you do a remake, so it is always risky." Commonsensemedia called "Reach Out" a "hit single" that "features more aggressive sexual lyrics than on previous [Hilary Duff] albums. While Dignity was OK for 11 year olds, the Best Of [Hilary Duff] compilation pushes the target age higher." Bill Lamb from About.com praised the production on "Reach Out" writing "Duff's new pop lyrics and vocals courtesy collaboration with Ryan Tedder, leader of OneRepublic and one of the hottest producers in the pop music industry."

Music video
The music video for "Reach Out" was filmed on September 13–14, 2008 in Los Angeles and was directed by Philip Andelman. The video premiered on MySpace on October 28, 2008. About.com said that "the video is cute, minus the extraneous rap".

The video opens with scantily-clad people streaking in the backyard of a mansion, then shows R. Prophet rapping in front of a fountain. Light BDSM references are briefly shown with flashes of Duff's wrists being tied and Duff being blindfolded. There are scenes of Duff dancing in front of a mirror and sitting on a sofa wearing a long white dress; in the same room she can be seen holding a shirtless man's leg. In another scene Duff can be seen at a dining table which is covered with food. Later she is shown with red lipstick lying on the floor and singing, intercut with scenes of her caressing the shirtless man. During Prophet's rap, he is sitting on a throne chair while Duff is singing in a pool while wearing a dress. At the climax of the song, Duff can be seen sucking a man's thumb. The video is intercut with various scenes of Duff caressing a statue and rubbing against the wall. The video ends with more footage of Duff sitting on the dinner table and more scenes of people running outside in undergarments.

The international version does not include the light BDSM references or the thumb sucking scenes and the ending is slightly different. It replaces these scenes with more of Duff on the table with the food and new scenes of Duff singing under a pool table.

Track listing

Charts

Release history

See also
 List of number-one dance singles of 2008 (U.S.)

References 

2008 singles
Hilary Duff songs
Songs written by E. Kidd Bogart
Songs written by Ryan Tedder
Songs written by Martin Gore
Hollywood Records singles
2008 songs
Music videos directed by Philip Andelman